Theotis "Trey" Brown, III (born March 1, 1985) is a former American football cornerback who is currently a Senior Personnel Executive for the Cincinnati Bengals after being hired by the Bengals in 2021.

Career

Playing career
As a player, he was signed by the Chicago Bears as an undrafted free agent in 2009. He played college football at UCLA. He also played for the New York Sentinels.

NFL scout
Brown spent 9 years in the National Football League as a scout/executive.  From 2010 to 2012, he was a scout with the New England Patriots.  Then, from 2013 to 2018, he was with the Philadelphia Eagles in a variety of capacities including the Director of College Scouting from 2016 to 2018.  Brown has made the Super Bowl with all 3 NFL teams he has worked for: as an Area Scout after the 2011 season with the New England Patriots, as the Director of College Scouting after the 2017 season with the Philadelphia Eagles (where they beat the Patriots 41–33), and as a Scout after the 2021 season with the Cincinnati Bengals.

Brown has also interviewed for General Manager jobs in the NFL on three separate occasions:  with the Buffalo Bills in May 2017, the Oakland Raiders in December 2018, and the Las Vegas Raiders in January 2022.

AAF and XFL
After his first two stops in the NFL  Brown spent the next two years building rosters (and entire organizations) from scratch in the AAF with the Birmingham Iron and XFL with the St. Louis BattleHawks as it afforded him the opportunity to "do things that you probably wouldn't get a chance to do or get experience in the NFL."  In the AAF, he had already clinched a playoff spot with the Birmingham Iron when the league folded.  In the XFL, the BattleHawks were tied for first place in their division when the league folded.

Media
In 2016, he appeared in a Microsoft Surface Pro 4 TV commercial.

References

External links
Just Sports Stats
Chicago Bears bio
UCLA Bruins bio

1985 births
Living people
Players of American football from Kansas City, Missouri
American football cornerbacks
UCLA Bruins football players
Chicago Bears players
New York Sentinels players
New England Patriots scouts
Sportspeople from Overland Park, Kansas
Philadelphia Eagles scouts